Vilamendhoo, formerly one of the uninhabited islands of Alif Dhaal Atoll (South Ari Atoll) of the Maldives, has been developed into a 184-room 4 star plus resort, called Vilamendhoo Island Resort & Spa, managed by CCR (Crown & Champa Resorts). Some of the best diving points in Maldives are located in Ari Atoll.

Locale
Surrounded by a lagoon and long stretches of white, sandy beach, it is the only resort on the island, and measures about  – . Seaplane transfer from Male International Airport is a 25-minute flight. A reef encircles the island, with stray reef sprouts above and below.

Reef
Due to the rise in temperature caused by La Niña, the coral had died but is starting to recover.

Wildlife
Whilst there is much life in the ocean, there are also many exotic creatures living on the island.

References

External links
 Resort website

Islands of the Maldives
Resorts in the Maldives